Agnyaathavaasi is a 2018 Indian Telugu-language action drama film written and directed by Trivikram Srinivas. The film stars Pawan Kalyan, Aadhi Pinisetty, Keerthy Suresh, Anu Emmanuel. The film began its principal photography in April 2017 which ended in November 2017. Anirudh Ravichander composed the film's score and soundtrack.

Upon release on 10 January 2018, during the Sankranti festival weekend, it received mixed-to-negative reviews from both critics and audiences, alike. The performances of the cast, production values, cinematography, background scores, and action sequences received praise. However, the direction, writing, screenplay, pace, and songs were highly criticized. The film was a box-office bomb, recovering less than half of its investment. It was dubbed in Hindi as Yevadu 3.

Plot 
Govinda "Vindha" Bhargav, a powerful businessman receives the news of his younger son Mohan Bhargav's death in a car accident while he is in Italy. Later, The assassins enter his hotel room and one of whom holds up a phone, and on the other end are Vindha's friends Sharma and Varma, who tell him that this was their plan all along and now with his son dead as well (implying that they planned it), his "empire" has no heir. Vindha secretly records this conversation before being gunned to death by the gunmen.

The news of Vindha's death along with his belongings reaches his second wife, Indrani Bhargav, who hears the audio file of Vindha's alleged killers. She calls Appaji, brother of Vindha's decreased first wife Krishnaveni, to call for an unknown person. Appaji informs the unknown person, who is none other than Abhishikth Bhargav, Vindha's eldest son. After performing his father's last rites in Varanasi, Abhi makes his way to Hyderabad from Assam, where his father's possible killers live. He scores a job in his office under the pseudonym Balasubramanyam, and makes friendships with Sukumari, Varma's daughter, and Suryakantham, Sharma's secretary who has a daughterly bond with Sharma. However, Abhi learns that the phone conversation must have been fake, since none of them have international calls registered on their phones, and now some unknown people are trying to kill him. Later that night, armed men break into his house and are killed by Abhi one after the other. The last one alive is killed in front of Indrani, only after revealing to them the true killer, Seetharam, son of Vindha's ex-business partner, Dheenabandhu.

The police investigation behind Vindha's death led by ACP Sampath comes to a conclusion when he contemplates about Vindha's past. Govindha Bharav, a middle-class man, had set up a successful pharmaceutical company that wished to set up a factory in a remote village. However, that plan failed as Vindha refuses to bribe a local politician, who responds by provoking the villagers to attack Vindha's factory with the help of Vindha's friend Aditya Bandaru. While escaping in a charter plane with his friends except for Aditya, they discover that the briefcase containing the vile for the medicine has been shot, destroying it.

However, Vindha hides the second one in a secret compartment in the same briefcase. After viewing their celebrations, he begins doubting them as well. When he goes to Bali on a holiday with his pregnant first wife, Krishnaveni Bhargav, there is an attempt on her life. She is presumed dead, although she is alive. Vindha senses danger to her life, thus sending her away to her brother Appaji's house. She dies shortly after giving birth to Abhi, who is raised as a person agnostic to the concept of wealth acquisition, which Vindha deems as the primary quality for someone to lead his empire after him. With Abhi's consent, he marries Indrani, who is now a mother to Mohan Bhargav. Abhi takes over the company, proclaiming he is Vindha's son. He tortures Sharma, Varma, and Koteswara Rao, who had a habit of harassing women in the workplace. When this news reaches Seetharam, he comes back to India and asks for evidence to prove that Abhi is Vindha's son. Abhi goes to Bulgaria with Sukumari and Suryakantham to recover Vindha's will, which stated that his wealth must go to Abhi.

However, that will is stolen by Seetharam with Appaji's help, and by threatening Sukumari and Suryakantham that he would kill Varma and Sharma. Seetharam destroys the will by burning, thus eradicating the evidence that Abhi is Vindha's son. However, when electing the future CEO for the company, Abhi fights Seetharam's goons on the roof of the building, after revealing that the will given to Seetharam was a fake one and that Appaji was part of Abhi's plan. After killing most of Seetharam's goons, one of the board members of the company reveals to Abhi that he is Aditya's brother, and that he was part of Vindha's murder since he wanted to avenge his brother's death. After confronting Abhi, the board member is attacked by Seetharam's henchman Parag, and they both slip off the rooftop. While Parag falls, Aditya's brother hangs by the logo of the company. After fighting Seetharam and telling him why he does not deserve the position of CEO, Abhi tells Aditya's brother that this company was a tribute to his friend, and the name of the company "AB group" was not named after him, but after Aditya Bandaru. After that, Aditya's brother falls to his death. Abhi goes back into the company, takes the position of CEO, and promises Indrani that he will fulfill his father's duties. At last, He speaks with Seetharam and tells that he has to stay in an isolated island where there is no accessibility.

Cast 

 Pawan Kalyan as Abhishikth Bhargav, Vindha's eldest son who disguises himself as Balasubramanyam and the main protagonist
 Aadhi Pinisetty as Seetharam, Dheenabandhu's son who wishes to take Vindha's company and the main antagonist
 Keerthy Suresh as Sukumari, Varma's daughter,  Abhi's girlfriend and fiancee 
 Anu Emmanuel as Suryakantham, Sarma's secretary
 Boman Irani as Govind Bhargav aka Vindha, Abhi and Mohan's father
 Khushbu as Indrani Bhargav, Abhi's stepmother
 Rao Ramesh as Varma, Vindha's friend
 Murali Sharma as Sarma, Vindha's friend
 Sampath Raj as DIG Sampath, the Police officer investigating the murder of Vindha
 Indraja as Krishnaveni Bhargav, Abhi's mother
 Pavitra Lokesh as Kumari, Sukumari's mother
 Tanikella Bharani as Appaji, Abhi's uncle
 Parag Tyagi as Parag, Security In-Charge Officer
 Ajay as Aditya Bandaru, Vindha's friend
 Sameer as Deenabandhu, Vindha's ex-business partner
 Jayaprakash as Daya Bandaru, Aditya's brother
 Vennela Kishore as Bala Subramanyam, a dim-witted man whose identity is used by Abhi to enter his company
 Chaitanya Krishna as Rohit, Suryakantham's ex-boyfriend
 Raja Chembolu as Sukumari's friend kidnapped by Abhi's team
 Raghu Babu as Koteswara Rao, a corrupt and flirtatious manager in Vindha's company
 Aadukalam Naren as MLA
 Srinivasa Reddy as Abhi's assistant
 Narra Srinu as Abhi's assistant
 Abhishek Maharshi as Abhi's assistant
 Avantika Vandanapu as Sampath's daughter
 Adithya as Seetharam's henchman
 Srikanth Iyyengar as Sampath's assistant
 Appaji Ambarisha Darbha as Writer
 Vamsee Aloor as Mohan Bhargav, Abhi's brother
Fish Venkat
Lahari Shari as Sushmita
Daggubati Venkatesh as Guru (cameo)

Production 
Principal photography began on 3 April 2017 with a small coffee shop scene, shot at Ciclo Cafe, then moved to a special set erected in Ramoji Film City for an action sequence. Some parts of the film were shot in Annapurna Studios and a major sequence and a song were shot in Bangkok. The unit moved to Bulgaria on 26 October 2017 for 15 days to shoot two songs. After the foreign schedule, shooting continued in Hyderabad and was completed by the end of November 2017, including a brief period of shooting at Varanasi.

After the film, Kalyan actively began his political campaign for the 2019 Andhra Pradesh election.

Music
The soundtrack was composed by Anirudh Ravichander, making his Tollywood debut. The first song, "Baitikochi Chusthe", was unveiled on 6 November 2017, the birthday of director Trivikram Srinivas.

Release 
The film was released on 10 January 2018. The film was then later released on Sun NXT for digital streaming, and the satellite rights are owned by Gemini TV. The film was later dubbed and released in Hindi as Yevadu 3 on YouTube and aired on Sony Max by Goldmines Telefilms on 20 October 2018.

Reception

Critical reception
Times of India critic Neeshita Nayapati gave the film 2.5/5 stars, noting, "Despite all the pomp and show, Agnyaathavaasi, has been an amazing ride had it either been taken seriously or been made with the same old Trivikram-Pawan Kalyan touch. However, the film lacks soul ... Pawan Kalyan aces through his role as usual, even if his body language and expressions ooze disinterest. In his review for The Indian Express, Manoj Kumar R rated the film 2/5 and stated, "Agnyaathavaasi is not the film we expected to see this holiday. It is strictly for fans of Power Star as Trivikram has spent the entire runtime gushing over Pawan Kalyan." Sangeetha Devi Dundoo of The Hindu wrote: "The film is beautifully shot (cinematography by Manikandan) and Anirudh Ravichander comes up with refreshing music that gives a classy sheen to this urban masala film. But these aren’t enough to salvage the film."

Writing for Variety, Joe Layden described the film as "a ferociously eager-to-please musical melodrama about ruthless ambition, violent revenge, and exuberantly schmaltzy music-video-style production numbers." IMDb had rated it a weighted average of 4.3/10, counting the votes of 3, 311 votes of the respective IMDb users who gave negative reviews.

Box office
The film was a commercial failure, recovering less than half of its investment.

Plagiarism allegations 
French director Jérôme Salle alleged that the film was plagiarised from his 2008 film Largo Winch. Following this, T-Series, which owns the remake rights of Largo Winch, sent a legal notice to the makers of the film, asking for the censored copy of the film. It was later reported that T-Series was demanding  from the makers of Agnyaathavaasi for allegedly violating copyright. The agreement between Agnyaathavaasi makers and T-Series management was amicably closed after the makers agreed to compensate them after taking into consideration that though the director had not taken the entire plotline of Largo Winch, he had written a few key scenes of Agnyaathavaasi based on scenes from the French film.

References

External links

2010s Telugu-language films
2018 action drama films
2018 films
Films directed by Trivikram Srinivas
Films involved in plagiarism controversies
Films scored by Anirudh Ravichander
Films shot in Bangkok
Films shot in Bulgaria
Indian action drama films